The Klöckner-Humboldt-Deutz DZ 710 was a German aircraft engine manufactured by Motorenfabrik Oberursel A.G. in the early 1940s. It was a 16-cylinder horizontally-opposed, two cycle diesel engine. A larger 32-cylinder variant, the Klöckner-Humboldt-Deutz DZ 720 was basically two DZ 710's 'bolted' together to make an H engine configuration.

Neither design saw operational use before the end of the war and work on them was halted in late 1945 after the factories were captured by the Allies and turned into makeshift tank repair depots.

Specifications (DZ 710)

References
 http://www.ibiblio.org/pub/academic/history/marshall/military/airforce/engines.txt

Aircraft diesel engines
1940s aircraft piston engines